Science and Engineering Research Board is a statutory body under the Department of Science and Technology, Government of India, established by an Act of the Parliament of India in 2009 ( SERB ACT,2008). The Board is chaired by the Secretary to the Government of India in the Department of Science and Technology and shall have other senior government officials  and eminent scientists as members. The Board was set up for promoting basic research in science and engineering and to provide financial assistance to scientists, academic institutions, R&D laboratories, industrial concerns and other agencies for such research.

Schemes and programmes

The Board has schemes for funding extramural research, for providing grants for start-up research and for using the scientific expertise of retired scientists. The Board also has programmes for intensifying research in high priority areas,  for supporting  international travel of scientists, for giving assistance to professional bodies for conducting seminars and symposia, and for awarding fellowships.

1. POWER- Promoting Opportunities for Women in Exploratory Research.

It is a scheme to mitigate gender disparity in science and engineering research funding in various S&T programs in Indian academic institutions and R&D laboratories.

List of members of the Board

The following persons are (January 2014) the members of the Board.

 Secretary to the Government of India in the Department of Science and Technology, Chairperson
 Member Secretary, Planning Commission/ CEO, NITI Ayog (Member, ex-officio)
 Secretary to the Government of India in the Department of Biotechnology (Member, ex-officio)
 Secretary to the Government of India in the Department of Scientific and Industrial Research (Member, ex-officio)
 Secretary to the Government of India in the Ministry of Earth Sciences (Member, ex-officio)
 Secretary to the Government of India in the Department of Expenditure (Member, ex-officio)
 Secretary to the Government of India in the Department of Health Research (Member, ex-officio)
 Prof Chandra Shakher, Indian Institute of Technology, Delhi
 Prof Pallab Banerji, Indian Institute of Technology, Kharagpur
 Prof Seyed E Hasnain, Vice Chancellor, Jamia Hamdard, New Delhi
 Dr G Satheesh Reddy, Scientific Advisor, Raksha Mantri, New Delhi
 Prof Rana Pratap Singh, Indian Institute of Technology, Delhi
 Prof Yogesh Singh, Vice Chancellor, Delhi Technological University, Delhi
 Prof Abhay Karandikar, Director, Indian Institute of Technology, Kanpur
 Dr Shashi Bala Singh, Director, NIPER Hyderabad
 Dr T V Mohandas Pai, Chairman, Manipal Global Education Services, Bangalore

References

External links
 Website of SERB
 Website of Electronic Project Proposal Management System

Science and technology in India
Ministry of Science and Technology (India)